Iron Marshal may refer to:

Shaughnessy: The Iron Marshal, 1996 CBS Western TV movie
Louis-Nicolas Davout, French general
Floriano Peixoto, Brazilian soldier and politician